Hellmuth Felmy (28 May 1885 – 14 December 1965) was a German general and war criminal during World War II, commanding forces in occupied Greece and Yugoslavia. A high-ranking Luftwaffe officer, Felmy was tried and convicted in the 1948 Hostages Trial.

Biography
Born Walter Hellmuth Wolfgang Felmÿ on 28 May 1885 in Berlin to Otto Emil Alexander and Anna Martha Maria [Fleischer] Felmÿ. In 1904, he joined the Imperial Army and, in 1912, Felmy went to flight school to become a pilot for the Imperial Army Air Service. During World War I, Felmy commanded a squadron on the Turkish Front. After the war, he remained in the German military. Felmy alternated between infantry and aviation assignments in the Reichswehr of the Weimar Republic. On 4 February 1938, Felmy was promoted to General der Flieger.

By the beginning of World War II, Felmy commanded Air Fleet 2 (Luftflotte 2) of the Luftwaffe. On 12 January, he was dismissed due to the Mechelen Incident and replaced by Albert Kesselring. The reputation of his sons, also members of the Luftwaffe, were also tarnished. In an effort to rehabilitate his family he joined the Nazi Party (against protocol).

In May 1941, Felmy was called up by the High Command of the Armed Forces (Oberkommando der Wehrmacht, or OKW) to be the commander of Special Staff F, the military mission to Iraq. While Felmy was a General der Flieger, he was not responsible for commanding the air force component of the Special Staff. Sonderstab F lasted from 20 May to 20 June, ending in failure. Felmy commanded the mission in Iraq from occupied Greece.

After the failure of the mission to Iraq, Felmy was appointed commander of Army Group Southern Greece (Befehlshaber Südgriechenland). From 1942 to 1943, he remained in Greece and commanded a "special deployment" (zur besonderen Verwendung, or z. b. V.) unit named after him (z. b. V. Felmy). From 1943 to 1944, he commanded the LXVIII Army Corps of the German Army. Late in 1944, the LXVIII Corps moved from Greece to Yugoslavia. From 1944 to 1945, he commanded the XXXIV Army Corps. In 1945, the XXXIV Corps was defeated during the Yugoslav Partisan General Offensive of March and April.

In 1948, during the Hostages Trial in Nuremberg, Felmy was convicted of war crimes in Greece and was given a sentence of 15 years. His sentence was reviewed by the "Peck Panel". He was released early, on 15 December 1951. On 14 December 1965, Felmy died in Darmstadt, West Germany.

Posthumous
In 2007, Felmy's writings about Cossacks who fought for the Germans, along with those of Walter Warlimont, were published in The Cossack Corps.

Felmy's son, Hansjörg Felmy (1931–2007), was a successful actor and appeared in the films Torn Curtain and Brainwashed.

See also
 Anglo-Iraqi War
 Axis occupation of Greece
 Massacre of Kalavryta
 Balkans Campaign
 Subsequent Nuremberg Trials
 XV SS Cossack Cavalry Corps

Notes

References
 
 
 
 

}

1885 births
1965 deaths
Military personnel from Berlin
People from the Province of Brandenburg
Luftstreitkräfte personnel
Luftwaffe World War II generals
Greece in World War II
German people convicted of crimes against humanity
People convicted by the United States Nuremberg Military Tribunals
Reichswehr personnel
Prussian Army personnel
Generals of Aviators
Luftwaffe personnel convicted of war crimes